Poirino is a comune (municipality) in the Metropolitan City of Turin in the Italian region Piedmont, located about  southeast of Turin.

Poirino borders the following municipalities: Chieri, Riva presso Chieri, Villanova d'Asti, Santena, Villastellone, Isolabella, Cellarengo, Pralormo, Ceresole Alba and Carmagnola.

Main sights
Tower of Valgorrera 
Castle of Ternavasso. 
Church of Madonna dell'Ala
Parish church of Santa Maria Maggiore 
Church of Spirito Santo
Oratory of San Sebastiano.

References

External links
Official website